Filip is a masculine given name and a surname, cognate to Philip.

In Croatia, the name Filip was among the most common masculine given names in the 2000s.

Notable people with the name include:

 Given name
 Filip Barović (born 1990), Montenegrin basketball player
 Filip Đorđević (born 1987), Serbian footballer
 Filip Filipović (born 1987), Serbian water polo player, Olympic champion
 Filip Hološko (born 1984), Slovak footballer
 Filip Cristian Jianu (born 2001), Romanian tennis player 
 Filip Marković (born 1992), Serbian footballer
 Filip Mișea (1873–1944), Aromanian activist, physician and politician
 Filip Petrušev (born 2000), Serbian basketball player
 Filip Ugran (born 2002), Romanian race car driver 
 Filip Verlinden (born 1982), Belgian kickboxer
 Filip Višnjić (1757–1834), Bosnian Serb poet and guslar
 Filip Zubčić (born 1993), Croatian alpine skier

 Surname
 Miroslav Filip (1928–2009), Czech chess grandmaster
 Ota Filip (1930–2018), Czech and German novelist, essayist, journalist
 Pavel Filip (born 1966), Moldovan politician 
 Petru Filip (born 1955), Romanian politician 
 Simion Filip, Romanian and Moldovan mathematician

See also

References

Given names of Greek language origin
Croatian masculine given names
Romanian masculine given names
Aromanian masculine given names
Romanian-language surnames
Surnames from given names
Serbian masculine given names
Slovak masculine given names